"4 sekunder" is a song written by Magnus Uggla and Anders Henriksson and recorded by Uggla on his 1993 album Alla får påsar.

The single peaked at number seven on the Swedish singles chart. Charting at Trackslistan for nine weeks between 2–16 October 1993, it peaked at number three. The song also charted at Svensktoppen for nine weeks between 23 October-18 December 1993, peaking at number five.

Charts

References 

1993 songs
1993 singles
Magnus Uggla songs
Songs written by Magnus Uggla
Songs written by Anders Henriksson (record producer)
Swedish-language songs